Nemom is an area in the city of Thiruvananthapuram (formerly Trivandrum). It is surrounded by Thirumala in the north, Malayinkeezhu in the north-east, Balaramapuram in the south-east, Kovalam in the south and Thiruvallam in the west. Nemom falls within the municipal corporation of Thiruvananthapuram, though partly exclusive. It is connected with Thiruvananthapuram, Neyyattinkara, Vizhinjam, Poovar, Kattakkada, Nagarcoil, and Kanyakumari through the main arterial highway National Highway 66.

Nemom has a Government Ayurveda Clinic. There is a public market at Pravachambalam, about one kilometre away from Nemom.. Vellayani Devi Temple is located in Nemom.

Politics
Nemom assembly constituency is part of Thiruvananthapuram Parliamentary Constituency.

Shashi Tharoor of Indian National Congress represents the area in the lower house of the Indian Parliament (Lok Sabha). V. Sivankutty of Communist Party of India (Marxist) is the MLA representing Nemom Assembly Constituency in the Kerala Legislative Assembly (Niyama Sabha) after 2021 assembly election. He is also the present Minister of the state for School Education. Deepika U of Bharatiya Janata Party (BJP) is the present councilor of Nemom Corporation Division.

Administration
Nemom consists of 2 wards of Thiruvananthapuram Corporation. The 66th ward named as Nemom and 67th named as Ponnumangalam.

Village
Nemom village comes under Thiruvananthapuram taluk of the six taluks of Thiruvananthapuram district namely, Thiruvananthapuram, Neyyattinkara, Nedumangad, Kattakada, Varkala and Chirayinkeezh.

Government Offices

Central Government
 Nemom Post Office
  Railway Station
 BSNL Telephone Exchange, Nemom
 Office of the Sub Divisional Engineer, BSNL

State Government
 Office of the Circle Inspector of Police (Nemom Police Station)
 Government Taluk Hospital, Santhivila, Nemom
 Thiruvananthapuram Corporation Zonal Office, Nemom
 Nemom Village Office
 Nemom Sub Registrar's Office
 KSEB Section Office, Nemom
 PWD Section Office, Nemom
 Kerala State Handloom Development Corporation, Regional Office, Nemom.
 Government Ayurveda Dispensary, Nemom

Educational institutions
 Sree Vidyadhiraja Homoeopathic Medical College
 Sree Vidyadhiraja Pharmacy College
 Victory Boy's Higher Secondary School
 Victory Girl's High School
 Tolstoy Memorial Public School, Santhivila
 New UPS, Santhivila
 Little Flower Convent, Vellayani Jn.
 Government UP School, Nemom
 Swami Vivekananda Mission Central School, Koliakode
 Government HS school Pappanamcode
 St. Antonys School, Karakkamandapam
 Vyasa vidhyalayam, Nemom

Other Major Establishments
 Merryland Studio, which played important roles in the history of Malayalam cinema, was opened in 1951 by veteran director-producer P. Subramaniam)
 Venus Engineering Works & Foundry Ltd.(Bicycle parts manufacturing unit of Metro Exporters, Mumbai)
 Vellayani Devi Temple
 Thaliyadichapuram Sree Mahadeva Temple
 Maha Ganapathy Temple
 Alamvila Nagaraja Temple
 Elappikal Devi Temple
 Thrikkannapuram Sreekrishna Swami Temple
 Ananthapuram Service Co-operative Bank Nemom
 Nemom Muslim Juma Masjid, Vellayani Jn.
 Assemblies of God Churches
 CSI Church Nemom, Nemom
 Swaraj Grandhashala (Library), Nemom
 Nemom Service Cooperative Bank, Vellayani Jn.
 Kuruvani Juma Masjid
 LS Asafoetida company, Nemom

External links
 Kerala State election 2006 results of Nemom constituency
 Map of Thiruvananthapuram District
 Thiruvananthapuram Administration
 Development is the core theme in Nemom
 CSI Church Nemom

References

Suburbs of Thiruvananthapuram